"The Defender" was an American television play broadcast live in two parts on February 25, 1957, and March 4, 1957, as part of the CBS television series, Studio One. A courtroom drama, it was written by Reginald Rose and directed by Robert Mulligan.  The cast included Ralph Bellamy and William Shatner as a father-son defense team, Steve McQueen as the defendant, and Martin Balsam as the prosecutor.

Plot 

Walter Preston (Ralph Bellamy) and his son Kenneth (William Shatner), fresh out of law school, defend Joseph Gordon (Steve McQueen) who is charged with felony murder. Gordon is accused of robbing the apartment of a psychiatrist, Victor Wallach, and strangling his wife. Francis Toohey (Martin Balsam) is the prosecutor.

The story turns on Walter Preston's belief that his client is guilty, and his son's belief that the client is innocent. Gordon is consistent throughout in insisting that he is innocent.

Gordon was the delivery boy for a butcher shop. He was assigned to deliver meat to the Wallach apartment on the morning of the crime. He did not return to the butcher shop after the delivery. The police found him at his home and arrested him there.

The victim's maid testifies that she was hit by an intruder whom she identifies as Gordon. When she regained consciousness, Mrs. Wallach was dead. Despite efforts to shake her story on cross-examination, the maid insists that Gordon was the man who struck her. She has no doubt.

Father and son have different view as to how far to go in order to raise doubt in the minds of jurors.  The prosecutor pursues the case aggressively. Walter is reluctant to use some aggressive tactics, telling his son that he has to live in this community. Kenneth asks: "Shouldn't there be someone to fight as hard to free him as Toohey fights to kill him?"

Walter agrees to use his son's proposed tactic.  He recalls the maid to identify the man who hit her.  She identifies the man sitting at the defense table. The defense then calls Joseph Gordon, who rises from a seat in the audience. The man sitting at defense table, the man identified by the maid, was a law student who has nothing to do with the case but who bears some resemblance to the defendant.

While expressing disapproval of the tactic, the court grants a motion for directed verdict and frees the defendant. Walter remains unsure whether his client was guilty and whether he did the right thing.

Cast
The cast included performances by:

 Ralph Bellamy as Walter Preston (defense attorney)
 Martin Balsam as Francis Toohey (prosecutor)
 Steve McQueen as Joseph Gordon (defendant)
 William Shatner as Kenneth Preston (defense attorney)
 Ian Wolfe as Judge Marsala
 Vivian Nathan as Mrs. Gordon
 David J. Stewart as Dr. Victor Wallach
 Dolores Sutton as Norma Lane
 Eileen Ryan as Betsy Fuller
 Arthur Storch as Seymour Miller
 Rosetta LeNoire as Mary Ellen Bailey
 John McGovern as Dr. Horace Bell
 Rudy Bond as Peter D'Agostino
 Michael Higgins as Sgt. James Sheeley
 Russell Hardie as 1st Guard
 Milton Selzer as 2nd Guard
 Iggie Wolfington as Court Clerk
 Frank Marth as First Reporter
 Ed Asner as Juror

Betty Furness  presents Westinghouse appliances in breaks after each of the acts.

Production
The program was aired as a live television play on CBS on successive Monday nights, February 25 and March 4, 1957. Herbert Brodkin was the producer and Robert Mulligan the director. Reginald Rose, who also wrote Twelve Angry Men (1954), wrote the story especially for Studio One.

It was reported to be the first live television drama divided for broadcast on separate nights and one of the first cliffhanger television broadcasts.  One critic objected to the decision, noting that splitting of dramas into multiple parts has the effect of "leaving audiences dangling on the cliff".  Writer Reginald Rose opted for a two-parter, because he felt the telling of the story required nearly two hours of air time.

The story led Reginald Rose to develop a spinoff series, The Defenders, which began airing in 1961.

The program was revived again in 1997 by the Showtime cable network. Showtime producer Stan Rogow hearkened back to the original program, noting that Studio One in 1957 "had a stature and tone to it, and nothing like that is done anymore."

Clips of the play were incorporated into an episode of the television series ‘’Boston Legal’’ in 2007.  The clips were used as flashback sequences for the William Shatner character, Denny Crane. “Son of the Defender” was episode 18 of season 3 of ‘’Boston Legal’’ and aired on April 3, 2007.

Reception
After the first hour, Jack Gould of The New York Times wrote that it was "not especially impressive" and was "consumed by rather tedious exposition that easily could have been summarized in far less time."

Critic Bill Ladd was more positive. He praised the "superb" camera direction and Rose's "compelling" story compared the courtroom drama to Twelve Angry Men and Caine Mutiny Court-Martial. He also praised Bellamy's performance: "Bellamy is at his best, than which there is no better".

After the second hour was aired, critic Hope Pantell praised the "fine acting" and praised the courtroom scenes as "well done and fascinating".

When the show was re-aired more than 30 years later, David Bianculli called it "one of the best dramas of the so-called Golden Age of Television".

References

1957 American television episodes
1957 television plays
Studio One (American TV series)